Matter of Dayz is the twelfth studio album by rapper Daz Dillinger. It was released on November 30 of 2010 by the Gangsta Advisory Records.

Track listing
The Track listing and guest features were confirmed by iTunes.

References

2010 albums
Daz Dillinger albums
Albums produced by Daz Dillinger